Hussein Mumin (born 24 March 1987) is a Greek professional footballer who plays as a midfielder for Super League 2 club Apollon Pontus.

Career
Mumin was born in Passos, Rhodope and he is of Pomak origin.

PAOK
He started his career in 2003 in Panthrakikos. During 2005, his performances with Komotini's club drew Xanthi's attention, but finally he was signed by PAOK.

Panserraikos
In January 2008, he moved to Panserraikos for a six-month loan.

Panetolikos
In 2008, Mumin signed for Panetolikos, where he stayed for three seasons.

Lamia
In 2014, Mumin signed for Lamia.

Trikala
In 2015, Mumin signed for Trikala.

Aris
On 1 July 2017, he agreed to join Aris on a two-year contract.

Iraklis
On 20 August 2018, he switched clubs, signing a contract with Iraklis.

AO Chania Kissamikos
On 23 December 2018 he signed a one-year contract with Football League side AO Chania Kissamikos on a free transfer.

Currently plays for Diagoras F.C.

References

External links
Profile at epae.org
Profile at myplayer.gr

1987 births
Living people
Greece youth international footballers
Greek people of Bulgarian descent
Greek Muslims
Greek footballers
PAOK FC players
PAS Lamia 1964 players
Trikala F.C. players
Aris Thessaloniki F.C. players
Panetolikos F.C. players
Panserraikos F.C. players
Iraklis Thessaloniki F.C. players
AO Chania F.C. players
Ionikos F.C. players
Diagoras F.C. players
Apollon Pontou FC players
Super League Greece players
Gamma Ethniki players
Football League (Greece) players
Super League Greece 2 players
Association football midfielders
People from Rhodope (regional unit)
Footballers from Eastern Macedonia and Thrace